The Manor House is a condominium building in the Edgewater neighborhood of Chicago, Illinois, USA. Built in 1908, it was designed by John Edmund Oldaker Pridmore in the Tudor Revival style. The building is commonly believed to be the former home of the British consul in Chicago, although the Edgewater Historical Society has argued that there is no evidence for this claim.

The building was added to the National Register of Historic Places in 1987. It was also included as part of the Bryn Mawr Historic District, which was added to the NRHP in 1995.

References

Houses completed in 1908
Buildings and structures in Chicago
Residential buildings on the National Register of Historic Places in Chicago
Apartment buildings in Chicago
Historic district contributing properties in Illinois
1908 establishments in Illinois